The Sukorambi Botanical Garden (Indonesian: Taman Botani Sukorambi) is a botanical garden located in Sukorambi, Jember Regency, East Java, Indonesia.

Location and description

The top and bottom are connected by both a staircase and footpath, the latter of which can also be used to convey visitors by motorcycle.The location is surrounded by rice paddies and includes an extensive forest. Aside from natural attractions, including flora and fauna, the site includes a fishing pond, pools (for adults and children), a two-story cafe and restaurant, a reading center (holding some 500 books and journals), and a meeting hall. There are also over 200 species of flowers and fruit trees. A variety of animals, including horses, rabbits and various types of birds are also present. The names of flora are written in both Latin and Indonesian, for easier identification.

History
Development of the Sukorambi Botanical Garden began in 2006. Initially the Regent of Jember, Abdul Kahar Muzakir, intended to use it for his family's personal recreation. However, after receiving input from friends and acquaintances, he ultimately decided to make the garden open to the public. The garden was formally established on 24 February 2007.

The garden had an average of 50 visitors daily in 2011, with numbers increasing to 200 on the weekends. By December 2012 that average had increased to 300 visitors daily, with 1,000 visitors per day visiting during the Christmas holidays. During that holiday the garden was one of Jember's most popular tourist attractions, together with Papuma Beach and Rembangan.

See also

 List of botanical gardens

References

Works cited

External links

Botanical gardens in Indonesia
2007 establishments in Indonesia
Geography of East Java
Tourist attractions in East Java